Prey for Eyes is the third full-length album by American band, The Red Chord. It is the second album that the band has released on Metal Blade Records. The album was produced by Eric Rachel at Trax East (Every Time I Die, A Life Once Lost) and features artwork by Paul Romano (Trivium, Mastodon, Maroon).

Background information
Band frontman Guy Kozowyk had the following to say:

Inspired by events where my brother, who is a prison guard, walks in on an inmate doing something ridiculous in his cell. The prisoner won’t talk and gets into this dialogue via a notepad. After documenting that he can no longer talk because the devil removed his tongue, my brother checks the con's mouth with his flashlight. When he tells him that his tongue is definitely intact, the inmate replies with the cryptic message "Pray for Eyes".

The album debuted at #198 on the Billboard 200 with sales of about 4,000 – 5,000 copies and at #3 on the Heatseekers Chart.

Track listing

"Dread Prevailed" was included in the Saw IV soundtrack.

Exclusive European bonus tracks and videos

Personnel

The Red Chord
 Guy Kozowyk – vocals
 Mike "Gunface" McKenzie – lead guitar, backing vocals
 Greg Weeks – bass guitar, backing vocals , percussion 
 Brad Fickeisen – drums, backing vocals 
 Jonny Fay – rhythm guitar, backing vocals , percussion

Additional personnel
 Jonny Davy – vocals 
 Nate Newton – vocals 
 Mirai Kawashima – keyboards, Moog synthesizer, composition, arrangement 
 Bob Carpenter, Nick Frasca – backing vocals 
 Michael Keller – backing vocals , percussion 
 Eric Rachel – production, engineering, mixing, backing vocals 
 Paul Romano – art direction, artwork, design
 Eric Kvortek, Kyle Neeley – engineering
 Nick Zampiello – mastering

References

External links
 The Red Chord official website
 

2007 albums
The Red Chord albums
Metal Blade Records albums